The 2013–14 season was Peterborough United's 54th year in the Football League and their first season in the third division of English football, League One, two years after their relegation from the Championship.

Squad

Statistics

|-
|colspan=14|Players out on loan:

|-
|colspan=14|Players who have left the club:

|}

Captains

Goals record

Disciplinary record

Contracts

Transfers

In

Loans in

Out

NotesAlthough officially undisclosed The Guardian reported the fee to be in the excess of £4.5 million.

Loans out

Pre-season

Competitions

League One

League table

Result summary

Result by round

Results

FA Cup

League Cup

League Trophy

Kit

|
|
|

Overall summary

Summary

Score overview

References

Peterborough United F.C. seasons
Peterborough United